Alvin is an English, French, German, Dutch, Polish, Hungarian, and Slovene male given name.

Etymology
Alvin was introduced in the 19th century based on surnames that were in turn derived from the Old English names Æthelwine and Ealdwine. The names mean "noble friend" and "old friend" respectively.

The corresponding German name is Alwin, which continues the Old High German names Albwin and Adalwin.

Uses

Given names
Alvin Adams (1804–1877, early 19th-century American businessman
Alvin Ailey, African-American choreographer and activist
Alvin Burke, Jr. (born 1973), birth name of Hassan Hamin Assad, better known as Montel Vontavious Porter (MVP)
Alvin Langdon Coburn (1882–1966 , photographer
Alvin Dark (1922–2014), Major League Baseball player and manager
Alvin Davis (born 1960), Major League Baseball player
Alvin Goldman (born 1938), American philosopher
Alvin Hall (born 1952), American financial advisor, author, and TV presenter
Alvin Harrison (born 1974), American Olympic gold medal runner
Alvin O. Hofstad (1905–1962), American farmer and politician
Alvin P. Hovey (1821–1891), American Civil War general, Indiana supreme court justice, congressman, and governor of Indiana
Alvin Hung, creator of GoAnimate
Alvin Karpis (1907–1979), noted American criminal and "public enemy"
Alvin Kraenzlein (1876–1928), American athlete, four-time gold medalist at the 1900 Paris Olympics
Alvin Boyd Kuhn (1880–1963), American religious scholar
Alvin Lee, born Graham Barnes (1944–2013), English guitarist and singer
Alvin Martin (born 1958), English footballer
Alvin Mitchell (disambiguation), multiple people
Alvin Moore (disambiguation), multiple people
Alvin Plantinga (born 1932), American philosopher
Alvin Francis Poussaint (born 1934), American psychiatrist
Alvin Robertson (born 1962), NBA basketball player
Alvin Saunders (1817–1899), governor of Nebraska Territory and later U.S. Senator from Nebraska
Alvin Stardust, born Bernard Jewry (1942–2014), English pop singer
Alvin Toffler (1928–2016), American writer and futurist
Alvin Williams (born 1974), American basketball player
Alvin Williams (born 1965), American football player
Alvin C. York (1887–1964), famous World War I soldier, Medal of Honor awardee

In popular culture
Alvin, one of many pseudonyms of Ken Laszlo, Eurobeat vocalist
Alvin Seville, of fictional animated characters Alvin and the Chipmunks
Father Alvin, a character in the 2018 role-playing video game Deltarune
Alvin Miller, the main protagonist of the alternate history fantasy novel series The Tales of Alvin Maker

See also
Alwin (disambiguation)
Alboin (disambiguation)

Dutch masculine given names
English masculine given names
French masculine given names
German masculine given names
Hungarian masculine given names
Polish masculine given names
Slovene masculine given names